Colin Rourke (born 1 January 1943) is a British mathematician who worked in PL topology, low-dimensional topology, differential topology, group theory, relativity and cosmology. He is an emeritus professor at the Mathematics Institute of the University of Warwick and a founding editor of the journals Geometry & Topology and Algebraic & Geometric Topology, published by Mathematical Sciences Publishers, where he is the vice chair of its board of directors.

Early career 
Rourke obtained his Ph.D. at the University of Cambridge in 1965 under the direction of Christopher Zeeman.

Most of Rourke's early work was carried out in collaboration with Brian Sanderson. They solved a number of outstanding problems: the provision of normal bundles for the PL category (which they called "Block bundles"), the non-existence of normal microbundles (top and PL), and a geometric interpretation for all (generalized) homology theories (joint work with Sandro Buoncristiano, see bibliography).

Rourke was an invited speaker at the International Congress of Mathematicians in 1970 at Nice.

Open University 
From 1976-1981 Rourke was acting professor of pure mathematics at the Open University (on secondment from Warwick) where he masterminded the rewriting of the pure mathematics course.

Poincaré Conjecture
In September 1986 Rourke and his graduate student, Eduardo Rêgo (later at University of Oporto), claimed to have solved the Poincaré Conjecture.  Reaction by the topological community at the time was highly skeptical, and during a special seminar at University of California, Berkeley given by Rourke, a fatal error was found in the proof.

The part of the proof that was salvaged was a constructive characterization and enumeration of Heegaard diagrams for homotopy 3-spheres.  A later-discovered algorithm of J. Hyam Rubinstein and Abigail Thompson identified when a homotopy 3-sphere was a topological 3-sphere.  Together, the two algorithms provided an algorithm that would find a counterexample to the Poincaré Conjecture, if one existed.

In 2002, Martin Dunwoody posted a claimed proof of the Poincaré Conjecture.  Rourke identified its fatal flaw.

Geometry & Topology 
In 1996, dissatisfied with the rapidly rising fees charged by the major publishers of mathematical research journals, Rourke decided to start his own journal, and was ably assisted by Robion Kirby, John Jones and Brian Sanderson.  That journal became Geometry & Topology.  Under Rourke's leadership, GT has become a leading journal in its field while remaining one of the least expensive per page.  GT was joined in 1998 by a proceedings and monographs series, Geometry & Topology Monographs, and in 2000 by a sister journal, Algebraic & Geometric Topology.  Rourke wrote the software and fully managed these publications until around 2005 when he cofounded Mathematical Sciences Publishers (with Rob Kirby) to take over the running).  Mathematical Sciences Publishers has now grown to become a formidable force in academic publishing.

Cosmology 
In 2000 Rourke started taking an interest in cosmology and published his first substantial foray on the arXiv preprint server in 2003.  For the past ten years he has collaborated with Robert MacKay, also of Warwick University, with papers on redshift, gamma-ray bursts and natural observer fields. He is currently working on a completely new paradigm for the universe, one that involves neither dark matter nor a Big Bang. This new paradigm is presented in "A new paradigm for the universe" (see bibliography).

The main idea is that the principal objects in the universe form a spectrum unified by the presence of a massive or hypermassive black hole.  These objects are variously called quasars, active galaxies and spiral galaxies.  The key to understanding their dynamics is angular momentum and the key tool is a proper formulation of "Mach's principle" using Sciama's ideas. This is added to standard general relativity in the form of hypothesized "inertial drag fields" which carry the forces that realize Mach's principle. This formulation solves the causal problems that occur in a naive formulation of the principle.

The new approach provides an explanation for the observed dynamics of spiral galaxies without needing dark matter and gives a framework that fits the observations of Halton Arp and others that show that quasars typically exhibit instrinsic redshift.

Bibliography
 
 
 Rourke, Colin (2017), A new paradigm for the universe, https://arxiv.org/abs/astro-ph/0311033, http://msp.warwick.ac.uk/~cpr/paradigm/master.pdf, Amazon (Kindle and paperback versions)

References

External links
 
 

1943 births
Living people
20th-century  English mathematicians
Topologists
Academics of the University of Warwick
Alumni of the University of Cambridge